Charline Van Snick (born 2 September 1990 in Liège) is a Belgian judoka who won bronze in the Woman's Judo 48 kg in the 2012 Summer Olympics. She also earned a bronze medal at the 2010 European Judo Championships and a silver medal at the 2012 and 2013 European Judo Championships.

Fighting in the -48kg division, Van Snick was Belgian cadet age class champion in 2006, and Belgian junior champion in 2007.  She won a bronze medal at the European Under 20 Championship at the age of 17.  In 2009, she became European U20 champion and won the 5th spot in the World Junior Championship. As a reward for this, she was awarded the Sports Merit Trophy distributed by the French Community. In 2010, she won at her first senior European Championship medal, a bronze, in Vienna.

In 2012 Van Snick won the silver medal at the European Championships. On Saturday 28 July 2012, she won a bronze medal at the Olympic Games 2012 in London. In the qualifying round, she beat the Korean Chung Jung-yeon with ippon. In the quarter-finals, she beat the Hungarian Éva Csernoviczki, also with ippon. She lost in the semi-finals against the eventual Olympic champion, Sarah Menezes to yuko. The match which decided the bronze medal was won by Van Snick against the Argentinian Paula Pareto, after the latter got a second shido.

In April 2013 Van Snick won the silver medal at the European Championships, losing in the final to Csernoviczki.

She won two gold medals at European Championship level, in 2015 and 2016, as well as silvers in 2012 and 2013. 

At the end of 2016, having lost in the second round at the 2016 Summer Olympics, Van Snick moved up to the -52kg weight division. In 2021, she competed in the women's 52 kg event at the 2020 Summer Olympics in Tokyo, Japan.

Doping case
In August 2013 Van Snick won a bronze medal at the World Championships in Rio de Janeiro. On 14 October 2013 it was announced that Van Snick had tested positive for cocaine in Rio. Van Snick maintained her innocence. On 29 October 2013 it was announced that a hair analysis that Van Snick commissioned by the Katholieke Universiteit Leuven's toxicology lab proved negative for habitual cocaine use. Toxicological research proved the presence of 2,3 picogram cocaine per milligram in the hair for the period form 10 August to 10 October 2013, which is 200 times less than the amount in a strain for a habitual user, and a complete absence of cocaine in the part of the hair dating before 10 August. However, on 30 November 2013 it was announced that the official retest also showed positive for cocaine. On 3 January 2014, she was banned by the IJF for a period of two years. Van Snick announced she would appeal the ban with the Court for Arbitration for Sport (CAS). On 4 July 2014, CAS decided that Van Snick's appeal would be partially upheld. CAS found that the most likely explanation for the presence of cocaine was sabotage by a third party and consequently annulled the two-year ban. CAS acknowledged the existence of an anti-doping rule violation, but declared that Van Snick was not to blame. As the positive test was taken in competition, her results obtained during the Judo World Championships in Rio de Janeiro 2013 remain annulled in accordance with article 9 of the World Anti-Doping Code.

Palmarès
Source:

2007
 Belgian Championships -48 kg, Hasselt
2008
 Belgian Championships -48 kg, Herstal
 European U20 Championships -48 kg, Warsaw
2009
 European Cup -48 kg, Baar
 European Cup -48 kg, London
 European U20 Championships -48 kg, Yerevan
2010
 World Cup -48 kg, Sofia
 World Cup -48 kg, Birmingham
 Grand Prix -48 kg, Rotterdam
 European Championships -48 kg, Vienna
2011
 World Cup -48 kg, São Paulo
 Grand Prix -48 kg, Amsterdam
 Grand Prix -48 kg, Qingdao
 Belgian Championships -48 kg, Ronse
 Grand Prix -48 kg, Düsseldorf
 Grand Slam -48 kg, Rio de Janeiro
 Grand Slam -48 kg, Tokyo
2012
 Grand Prix -48 kg, Düsseldorf
 European Championships -48 kg, Chelyabinsk
 Olympic Games -48 kg, London
 Grand Slam -48 kg, Moscow
2013
 Grand Prix -48 kg, Samsun
 European Championships -48 kg, Budapest
2014
 Grand Prix -48 kg, Tashkent
 Grand Prix -48 kg, Zagreb
2015
 European Games -48kg, Baku
 European Championships -48kg, Baku
 Grand Prix -48 kg, Düsseldorf
 Grand Slam -48 kg, Baku
 Grand Slam -48 kg, Paris
2016
 European Championships -48kg, Kazan
2017
 Grand Slam -52 kg, Abu Dhabi
 Grand Slam -52 kg, Baku
 Grand Prix -52 kg, Tashkent
 Grand Prix -52 kg, The Hague
2018
 Grand Prix -52 kg, The Hague
 Grand Prix -52 kg, Budapest
 Grand Slam -52 kg, Düsseldorf
 Grand Prix -52 kg, Zagreb
2019
 Grand Slam -52 kg, Yekaterinburg

2020
 European Championships -52kg, Prague

References

External links
 

1990 births
Judoka at the 2012 Summer Olympics
Judoka at the 2016 Summer Olympics
Living people
Olympic bronze medalists for Belgium
Olympic judoka of Belgium
Olympic medalists in judo
Sportspeople from Liège
Medalists at the 2012 Summer Olympics
Belgian female judoka
European Games gold medalists for Belgium
Judoka at the 2015 European Games
European Games medalists in judo
Judoka at the 2019 European Games
Judoka at the 2020 Summer Olympics